Shah Mansuri may refer to:
 Shah Mansuri, Hormozgan
 Shah Mansuri, Ilam
 Shah Mansuri, Kerman

See also
 Shah Mansur, Iran (disambiguation)